Igor Sergeyevich Kaleshin (born 29 May 1983) is a Russian former professional football player.

Personal life
His uncle Igor and cousins Vitali and Yevgeni are all footballers as well.

External links
 

1983 births
People from Maykop
Living people
Russian footballers
Association football defenders
FC Lada-Tolyatti players
FC Chernomorets Novorossiysk players
FC Tyumen players
FC Volgar Astrakhan players
FC Arsenal Tula players
Russian Premier League players
FC Orenburg players
Sportspeople from Adygea